The UMBC Retrievers women's basketball team represents the University of Maryland, Baltimore County in National Collegiate Athletic Association (NCAA) Division I competition as a member of the America East Conference.

History
Since beginning play in 1968, the Retrievers have an all-time record of 496–695, as of the end of the 2015–16 season.

In 2007, UMBC won the conference title for the first time ever, beating Hartford 48–46 to clinch their first ever title and first ever tournament berth. In the First Round of the NCAA Tournament, they lost to Connecticut 82–33. They won the regular season title in 2011, but they wound up in the WNIT after losing in the America East Tournament. They lost 59–47 to Florida in the First Round.

NCAA tournament results

References

External links